The Miracle is a 1987 French comedy film directed by Jean-Pierre Mocky. It was entered into the 37th Berlin International Film Festival.

Cast
 Michel Serrault as Ronald Fox Terrier
 Jean Poiret as Papu
 Jeanne Moreau as Sabine, dite 'La Major'
 Sylvie Joly as Mrs. Fox Terrier
 Jean Rougerie as Monseigneur
 Roland Blanche as Plombie
 Sophie Moyse as Angelica
 Marc Maury as L'abbé Humus / Father Humus
 Hervé Pauchon as Joulin
 Georges Lucas as Le miraculé Dulac
 Jean Abeillé as Victor
 Dominique Zardi as Rondolo

References

External links

1987 films
1987 comedy films
1980s French-language films
Films directed by Jean-Pierre Mocky
Films about Catholicism
French comedy films
Golan-Globus films
1980s French films